National Indigenous Veterans Day (also known as National Aboriginal Veterans Day) is a memorial day observed in Canada in recognition of aboriginal contributions to military service, particularly in the First and Second World Wars and the Korean War. It occurs annually on 8 November. The day was first commemorated in 1994. The special memorial was created because before 1994 Indigenous veterans were not recognized in Remembrance Day activities. Indigenous veterans had to overcome many obstacles to serve Canada in these wars, including adjusting to new cultures, sometimes learning to speak new languages (usually English) and travelling long distances to enlist.

The memorial was inaugurated in Winnipeg in 1994, and has since spread nationwide.

References

External links
Aboriginal-Canadian Veterans at Veterans Affairs Canada.
Indigenous Veterans  at Veterans Affairs Canada
Nov. 8 marks National Aboriginal Veterans Day  at Department of National Defense, Government of Canada

Observances honoring victims of war
Veterans days
November observances
Veterans' affairs in Canada
Indigenous peoples days